The Church of the Immaculate Conception is a wayside Roman Catholic church located in what is known as Wied Gerżuma or Gerżuma valley, limits of Rabat, Malta.

History
The chapel originated in 1736 on lands owned by the Fondazione Paola which was a foundation that supported the building of sailing boats for the knights. The chapel was founded by Grand master António Manoel de Vilhena. Near the chapel is an arch on which is the coat of arms of Antoine de Paule, the Grand master who founded the Fondazione Paola and an inscription. The chapel was blessed by Fra Giuseppe Ruggier, the chaplain of the order, representing the grand prior of St John's Conventional church in Valletta. Since the church was the property of the Sovereign Military Order of Malta, the property was inherited by the subsequent governments that governed Malta after the expulsion of the order from Malta in 1798. In fact, the chapel is still the property of the state.

Interior
The chapel has one altar. Above it stands the painting depicting the Immaculate Conception, St Joseph, St Paul, St John the Baptist and St Anthony of Padoua.

See also
Catholic Church in Malta

References

Roman Catholic churches completed in 1736
Rabat, Malta
National Inventory of the Cultural Property of the Maltese Islands
Roman Catholic chapels in Malta
18th-century Roman Catholic church buildings in Malta